MMW can refer to:

 Medeski Martin & Wood, a jazz trio.
 Malibu's Most Wanted, a parody on life in the ghettos of L.A.
 Millimetre wave, electromagnetic radiation.
 MMW Enterprises, Inc., a construction company based in Jackson, OH.
 MMW, a radar tracking station in Roi-Namur island in the north part of the Kwajalein atoll in the Marshall Islands.
 Muppets Most Wanted, a 2014 film.
 Miami Music Week, weeklong marathon of electronic dance music events that takes place in Miami during the last week of March.
 Mickey Mouse Works, a television series featuring Mickey Mouse, and his friends in a series of animated shorts

See also
 2MW, an Australian radio station